The Monic  languages are a branch of the Austroasiatic language family descended from the Old Monic language of the kingdom of Dvaravati in what is now central Thailand. The Nyahkur people continue directly from that kingdom, whereas the Mon are descendants of those who migrated to Pegu after the 11th century Khmer conquest of Dvaravati.

Classification
Paul Sidwell (2009:114) proposes the following tree ("stammbaum") for Monic, synthesizing past classifications from Theraphan L-Thongkum (1984) and Gérard Diffloth (1984).

Old Mon / Proto-Monic
Nyah Kur
North
Central
South
Middle Mon
Literary Mon
Mon Ro: Northernmost dialect, spoken in the Pegu-Paung-Zingyaik area
West Mon Ro variety: Spoken from north of Martaban to Thaton
East Mon Ro variety: Spoken in a small area on the south bank of the Gyaing River
Mon Rao: Spoken around Moumein, extending several hundred kilometers south to Tavoy
North Mon Rao
Kamawet area Mon
South Mon Rao
Ye Mon Rao: This is the southernmost Mon variety.
Thai Mon (mix of Mon Ro and Mon Rao)

Proto-language

Selected animal and plant names in Proto-Monic, Proto-Nyah Kur, and Proto-Mon (Diffloth 1984):

Mammals
{| class="wikitable sortable"
! species !! Proto-Monic !! Proto-Nyah Kur !! Proto-Mon
|-
| Tupaia sp. || *[c/s]naaʔ || *ɕhna̱aʔ || 
|-
| Panthera tigris corbetti || *klaaʔ || *khla̱aʔ || *kla̱ʔ
|-
| Lutrogale perspicillata, Lutra lutra nair || *phɛɛʔ || *phɛ̱ɛʔ || *phɛ̱ʔ
|-
| Bos gaurus readei || *kndiiŋ || *kənti̤iɲ || *kəlɤ̱i̯ɲ
|-
| Rusa unicolor equinus || *tɓuŋ || *thbu̱ŋ || *ɓɒ̱ɨ̯ŋ
|-
| Rucervus eldii thamin, Cervus eldi siamensis || *[r]maŋ || *ləma̤ŋ || *mɛ̤a̯ŋ
|-
| Muntiacus muntjak vaginalis, Muntiacus feae || *pas || *pa̱j̊ || *pɔ̱h
|-
| Hystrix hodgsoni || *lmliəŋ || *ləmli̤aŋ || *pəli̤ə̯ŋ
|-
| Ursus thibetanus || *kmu̱m || *khmu̱m || *[k]hmi̱m
|}

Birds
{| class="wikitable sortable"
! species !! Proto-Monic !! Proto-Nyah Kur !! Proto-Mon
|-
| Corvus splendens || *klʔaak || *kəlʔa̱ak || *həɗa̱i̯c
|-
| Caprimulgus macrurus || *klwaaʔ || *kəwa̱aʔ || *kəwa̱ʔ
|-
| Caprimulgus macrurus? || *ʔ[m]blak || *bla̱k || *ʔəplɛ̤a̯k
|-
| Spizaetus sp. || *liŋ-liəŋ || *liŋ-li̤aŋ || *kəni̤ə̯ŋ
|-
| Gallus gallus || *tjaaŋ || *chja̱aŋ || *ca̱i̯ɲ
|-
| Psittacula eupatria avensis, Psittacula finschii? || *kreeɲ || *krə̱əɲ || *krʌ̱i̯ɲ
|-
| Coturnix sp. || *cgɯt || *cəkɯ̤t || *hək[i̤/ɯ̤]t
|-
| Pseudogyps bengalensis? || *t-[m]-maat || *tə(m)ma̱at || *[k]əma̱t
|-
| Oriolus chinensis? || *mit || *mɯ̤t || *mi̤t
|-
| Treron phoenicopterus viridifrons || *prgum || *pərkṳm || *həkə̤m
|-
| Eudynamis scolopacea malayana || *t[]wa(a)w || *t()wa̱w || *kəwa̱o̯
|-
| Streptopelia orientalis || *puur || *pu̱ur || *pɒ̱u̯
|}

Other animals
{| class="wikitable sortable"
! species !! Proto-Monic !! Proto-Nyah Kur !! Proto-Mon
|-
| Periplaneta sp. || *sdɛɛʔ || *ɕətɛ̤ɛʔ || *həte̤ʔ
|-
| Apis dorsata || *saaj || *ɕa̱aj || *sa̱i̯
|-
| Trionyx cartilageneus || *dwiiʔ || *[c/t]həwi̤iʔ || *kwi̤ʔ
|-
| Fluta alba || *doŋ-nooŋ || *kənto̤oŋ ~ *tṳŋ-to̤oŋ || *hələ̤ɨ̯ŋ
|-
| Ophiocephalus striatus || *knlɔɔn || *kənlu̱an || *kəno̤n
|-
| Varanus nebulosus || *trkɔɔt || *təku̱at || *həko̱t
|}

Plants
{| class="wikitable sortable"
! species !! Proto-Monic !! Proto-Nyah Kur !! Proto-Mon
|-
| Bambusa arundinacea || *ɟrlaaʔ || *chəla̤aʔ || *həlɛ̤ə̯ʔ
|-
| Antiaris toxicaria || *kɟiiʔ || *kəci̤iʔ || *kji̤ʔ
|-
| Imperata cylindrica || *cwooʔ || *chwo̱oʔ || *khwɒ̱ɨ̯ʔ
|-
| Entada rheedii, Entada scandens || *ɟnlɛɛʔ || *khənlɛ̤ɛʔ || *həne̤ʔ
|-
| Eugenia cumini || *kriəŋ || *kri̱aŋ || *kri̱ə̯ŋ
|-
| Dipterocarpus alatus, Dipterocarpus turbinatus || *g[]jaaŋ || *khəja̤aŋ || *həja̤i̯ɲ
|-
| Pentace burmanica || *sit-siət || *ɕit-ɕi̱at || *kəsə̱t
|-
| Berrya mollis || *klwaan || *kəlwa̱an || *kəlwa̱an
|-
| Spondias mangifera || *[k]ʔiil || *[kh]əʔi̱il || *ʔi̱
|-
| Ficus bengalensis, Ficus religiosa || *ɟrəj || *chrə̤j || *sɔ̤e̯
|-
| Phyllanthus emblica || *trluuj || *təlu̱uj || *kəlu̱i̯
|}

Lexical innovations
Selected Monic lexical innovations:

See also
List of Proto-Monic  reconstructions (Wiktionary)
Mon language
Nyah Kur language

Footnotes

References
 Sidwell, Paul (2009). Classifying the Austroasiatic languages: history and state of the art. LINCOM studies in Asian linguistics, 76. Munich: Lincom Europa.

Further reading
 Monic language studies. (1984). Bangkok, Thailand: Chulalongkorn University Print. House.
Diffloth, Gérard. 1984 The Dvaravati Old Mon languages and Nyah Kur. Monic Language Studies. Chulalongkorn University Printing House, Bangkok.
Eppele, John William, Carey Statezni, and Nathan Statezni. 2008. Monic bibliography. Chiang Mai: Payap University.
Eppele, John William, Carey Statezni, and Nathan Statezni. 2008. Monic bibliography with selected annotations. Chiang Mai: Payap University.
Ferlus, Michel. 1983. Essai de phonétique historique de môn. Mon-Khmer Studies 12: 1–90.
Huffman, Franklin E. 1990. Burmese Mon, Thai Mon, and Nyah Kur: a synchronic comparison. Mon-Khmer Studies 16–17: 31–84.

External links
SEAlang Project: Mon–Khmer languages: The Monic Branch

Old Mon inscriptions